The Kinston Expos were a Minor League Baseball team of the Carolina League (CL), and the High-A affiliate of the Montreal Expos. They were located in Kinston, North Carolina, and were named for their parent club. The team played its home games at Grainger Stadium, which opened in 1949 and holds 4,100 fans.

Established in 1962, the Expos played through the 1974 season. The franchise folded following that season.

Kinston has served as a farm club for eleven different major league franchises and one minor league club. Professional baseball dates back to a 1908 squad in the Eastern Carolina League. Despite having one of the smallest markets in professional baseball, Kinston has proved its viability for over a century.

The franchise won a league title as the Kinston Eagles in 1962 as an affiliate of the Pittsburgh Pirates. Hundreds of men played for the franchise including Ron Guidry.

Kinston is served today by the Down East Wood Ducks, an affiliate of the Texas Rangers.

History 

The Eagles were able to claim the first of its Carolina League crowns. At a time when Kinston's population was only 25,000, the ball club attracted over 140,000 fans. Part of the lure was the talent supplied by Kinston's parent club, the Pittsburgh Pirates, which included Steve Blass (17–3, 1.97 ERA, 209 K's), and Frank Bork (19–7, 2.00 ERA). Another fan attraction was that the Eagles were for the first time a community owned team, operating under the non-profit Kinston Eagles Baseball Company, run by an elected eighteen-man, unpaid board of directors. Profits were reinvested into improving the stadium, promoting the team, and supplying playing equipment for the youth of Kinston. This arrangement continued through all thirteen years of Kinston's second tenure in the Carolina League, from  through .

In  minor league baseball was restructured nationwide, with B, C and D classes eliminated. The Carolina League became a High-A circuit. The Eagles failed to win any championships during this second era of Carolina League play, but they managed to make the playoffs in six of thirteen seasons. The Pirates stuck with Kinston through the  campaign. During three of those four seasons, the Eagles were managed by Harding "Pete" Peterson, who later oversaw the Pirates farm system, and become the Pirates' general manager, helping to build the late seventies team that won the World Series. From  through  the Eagles were affiliation with the New York Yankees; the fans saw a lot of future all-stars pass through the city including a young Ron Guidry who would soon establish himself as one of the best pitchers in the American League.

During the 1970s the popularity of minor league baseball reached its lowest point and the attendance in Kinston fell to only 30,000 for the  season. The city needed a revival of interest, and the Expos were turned to for help. The young Montreal franchise boasted a strong farm system with a lot of talent. So much talent in fact, that they decided to experiment with having two High A affiliates. Instead of dividing the players evenly between the two, all the top players were placed in the West Palm Beach club, while the newly renamed Kinston Expos had to make do with castoffs. The Kinston team soon found itself overmatched among its Carolina League rivals. The Expos fell to last place and attendance fell to only 27,000 for the year. Montreal declared the experiment a failure and withdrew from Kinston following the  season. With no major league sponsor and very little fan support, Kinston likewise withdrew from the league.

Grainger Stadium

The Kinston Expos, and all the Kinston teams since 1949, played their home games at Grainger Stadium located at 400 East Grainger Avenue in Kinston. The original structure was built by architect John J. Rowland in 1949 at a cost of $170,000 inclusive of everything except the land. $150,000 of the money was raised by bond issue. The stadium is owned by the city and leased by the team. A dedicatory plaque identifies the structure as "Municipal Stadium", but it has been called Grainger Stadium since it was first built. The name Grainger comes from its location on Grainger Avenue as well as its use early on by Grainger High School. Grainger is a prominent old family name in Lenoir County.

Season by season results 

TABLE NOTES:
 Sources

No Hitters

Conrad Noessel (6/11/1966) vs the Tidewater Tides (7 innings)
William Olsen (5/11/1970) vs the Burlington Senators
Bob Elliott (6/14/1970) vs the Lynchburg Twins (7 innings)

See also

 Grainger Stadium
 Carolina League

Bibliography

Autobiographies and biographies

League histories

Newspapers 
  – Issues for all seasons are available on microfilm at Lenoir Community College.

Official sources 
  – Programs are also referred to as yearbooks.
  – Over the years, this publication has also been known as Carolina League Media Guide and Record Book and Carolina League Directory and Record Book

Footnotes 

Baseball teams established in 1962
Lenoir County, North Carolina
Professional baseball teams in North Carolina
Montreal Expos minor league affiliates
New York Yankees minor league affiliates
Atlanta Braves minor league affiliates
Pittsburgh Pirates minor league affiliates
Sports clubs disestablished in 1974
1962 establishments in North Carolina
1974 disestablishments in North Carolina
Defunct baseball teams in North Carolina
Baseball teams disestablished in 1974